Andy Elliott is a footballer who played as a midfielder in the Football League for Manchester City and Chester City.

He played for Sligo Rovers in 1982/83 and won an FAI Cup winners medal that year when Sligo beat Bohemians 2-1 in the final.

He also played for Mossley.

References

1963 births
Living people
Footballers from Ashton-under-Lyne
Association football midfielders
English footballers
Manchester City F.C. players
Sligo Rovers F.C. players
Chester City F.C. players
Barrow A.F.C. players
English Football League players
Mossley A.F.C. players